The Guapi River is a river of Colombia that flows into the Pacific Ocean near the town of Guapi, Cauca.

The mouth of the river has extensive stands of mangroves, part of the Esmeraldes-Pacific Colombia mangroves ecoregion.

See also
List of rivers of Colombia

References

Sources

Rivers of Colombia